Carthew Neal is an Academy nominated film, television and interactive producer.

Neal produced Taika Waititi's satire Jojo Rabbit for Fox Searchlight, which received six Academy Award nominations, including Best Picture. He also produced Waititi's adventure comedy film Hunt for the Wilderpeople. It is based on best selling novel Wild Pork & Watercress written by Barry Crump. Hunt for the Wilderpeople premiered at the 2016 Sundance Film Festival. It became New Zealand's number #1 at the box office and sold out to all territories worldwide.

He also produced David Farrier and Dylan Reeve's feature documentary Tickled, which also premiered at the 2016 Sundance Film Festival. It was released by Magnolia and HBO in the US and sold by Magnolia worldwide. Neal executive produced Farrier's Dark Tourist (television series) for Netflix.

He also produced Madeleine Sami and Jackie van Beek's movie The Breaker Upperers which premiered at 2018 South by Southwest. It is distributed by Piki Films and Madman in New Zealand and Madman in Australia. It will screen on Netflix for the rest of the world in 2019.

He produced TV3 comedy Super City starring Madeleine Sami. Super City had two seasons directed by Taika Waititi and Oscar Kightley. It has been piloted in the United States with American Broadcasting Company.

He also produced a cartoon, Aroha Bridge, written by Coco Solid.

Carthew was associate producer on Walt Disney Pictures film Pete's Dragon, working under Barrie M. Osborne.

He produced Tanu Gago's interactive documentary FAFSWAGvogue.com with RESN.co.nz and Justin Pemberton's interactive documentary Ispydoc.com; a co-production with Canadian digital company Jam3. An early pioneer in interactive web storytelling, he produced and directed pick-a-path comedy 5 Minute Call in 2002 and London Calling in 2003.

Previously he conceived and produced two seasons of TV3's Wa$ted! environmental make-over series, which was remade around the world, including in America.

He was named Independent Producer of the Year in 2016 at the New Zealand SPADA conference. He was also named in Variety's 2016 Producers to Watch.

Filmography

Film

Television

References 

Living people
New Zealand producers
Year of birth missing (living people)